Manuel Alves Branco, the 2nd Viscount of Caravelas (7 June 1797 – 13 July 1855) was a Brazilian politician, economist, lawyer and magistrate during the period of the Empire of Brazil (1822–1889).

He was general deputy, justice minister, economy minister, senator and also the first prime-minister of the Empire (President of the Council of Ministers).

Biography
During his political career he was member of Chamber of Deputies, Minister of Justice, Minister of Finance, President of the Cabinet and Senator of the Empire of Brazil.
He was four times Minister of Finance - from May 16 to September 19, 1837; from September 1, 1839, to May 18, 1840; from February 2, 1844, to May 2, 1846, and from 22 May to 20 October 1847, resuming the post at November 18, 1847 and holding it until March 8, 1848. He was chairman of the Council of Ministers from 22 August 1847 to 8 March 1848.

References

1797 births
1855 deaths
Prime Ministers of Brazil
Finance Ministers of Brazil
Brazilian monarchists
Brazilian nobility
Members of the Chamber of Deputies (Empire of Brazil)